Isbell conjugacy (named after John R. Isbell) is a fundamental construction of enriched category theory formally introduced by William Lawvere in 1986.

Definition 

The Isbell conjugacy is an adjunction between the categories  and  arising from the Yoneda embedding  and the dual Yoneda embedding .

References

Bibliography 

.
.

Category theory